The Birkenkofel is a mountain in the Sexten Dolomites in South Tyrol, Italy.

References 
 Richard Goedecke, Alpenvereinsführer Sextener Dolomiten, Bergverlag Rudolf Rother, München 1988, 
 Tabacco-Verlag, Carta topografica 1.25.000, Blatt 010, Sextener Dolomiten

External links 

Mountains of the Alps
Mountains of South Tyrol
Sexten Dolomites